Bromley Cross is a residential area of South Turton in the Metropolitan Borough of Bolton, Greater Manchester, England. It gives its name to a larger electoral ward, which includes Eagley, Egerton, and Cox Green. Historically part of Lancashire, Bromley Cross lies on the southern edge of the West Pennine Moors.

Bromley Cross railway station is on the Ribble Valley Line.

In the 16th century, Arthur Bromley of Turton married Isabell Orrell, the granddaughter of the Lord of the manor of Turton. It is from this family the place derives its name.  It is supposed that there may once have been an ancient cross in the locality, although no physical evidence of it has been found.

Bromley Cross is a residential area, and in the 19th century was part of the township of Turton, and from 1898 part of Turton Urban District. The village of Bromley Cross grew in the 19th century in association with many factories and bleachworks, which used water power obtained from the Eagley Brook and its tributaries.

In the northern area is the "Last Drop Village", a collection of old farmhouses and farmbuildings which were restored in the 1960s into a pub, restaurant, bistro, craft shops, hotel and conference centre.

In 2002, youth workers discovered young people congregated in abandoned underground World War II air raid tunnels belonging to Eagley Mills. The tunnels have since been sealed.

See also

Listed buildings in South Turton

References

External links
 Photos and information about Bromley Cross

Geography of the Metropolitan Borough of Bolton
West Pennine Moors
Areas of Greater Manchester